Named for former National Union of Teachers (NUT) General Secretary Fred Jarvis and his late wife, the Fred and Anne Jarvis Award was established in 2007 and first awarded in 2008.  It was originally presented annually by the NUT to individuals outside the union who campaign on education and related issues but in 2017 the award was made to an NUT member.  From 2019 the award has been presented by the National Education Union, which has succeeded the NUT.  Fred Jarvis died in 2020 but the award continues.

Winners of the Fred and Anne Jarvis Award

References

Fred and Anne Jarvis Award winners
National Union of Teachers